The 1954 ICF Canoe Sprint World Championships were held in Mâcon, France. This event was held under the auspices of the International Canoe Federation.

The men's competition consisted of four Canadian (single paddle, open boat) and nine kayak events. Two events were held for the women, both in kayak. The type or number of events held at the championships remained unchanged from the previous championships.

This was the fourth championships in canoe sprint.

Medal summary

Men's

Canoe

Kayak

Women's

Kayak

Note
Zenz competed for Saar, but is listed in official reports as competing for West Germany.

Medals table

References
ICF medalists for Olympic and World Championships - Part 1: flatwater (now sprint): 1936-2007.
ICF medalists for Olympic and World Championships - Part 2: rest of flatwater (now sprint) and remaining canoeing disciplines: 1936-2007.

ICF Canoe Sprint World Championships
International sports competitions hosted by France
Icf Canoe Sprint World Championships
Icf Canoe Sprint World Championships
Canoeing and kayaking competitions in France